Grand Prix des Amériques may refer to:

 Grand Prix des Amériques (cycling race), a cycling race held between 1988 and 1992
 Grand Prix des Amériques (film award), an award given at the Montreal World Film Festival